The 1996 Philippine Basketball Association (PBA) Governors' Cup was the third and last conference of the 1996 PBA season. It started on September 29 and ended on December 17, 1996. The tournament is an Import-laden format, which requires an import or a pure-foreign player for each team.

Format
The following format will be observed for the duration of the conference: 
The teams were divided into 2 groups.

Group A:
Alaska Milkmen
Ginebra San Miguel
Purefoods Corned Beef Cowboys
Mobiline Cellulars

Group B:
Formula Shell Zoom Masters
San Miguel Beermen
Sta. Lucia Realtors
Sunkist Orange Bottlers

Teams in a group will play against each other once and against teams in the other group twice; 11 games per team; Teams are then seeded by basis on win–loss records. Ties are broken among point differentials of the tied teams. Standings will be determined in one league table; teams do not qualify by basis of groupings.
The top two teams will automatically qualify to the semifinals, while the next four teams will have a crossover quarterfinal round.
Quarterfinals:
QF1: #3 vs. #6, with #3 having the twice-to-beat advantage
QF2: #4 vs. #5, with #4 having the twice-to-beat advantage
Best-of-five semifinals:
SF1: QF1 vs. #4
SF2: QF2 vs. #3
Third-place playoff: losers of the semifinals
Best-of-seven finals: winners of the semifinals

Elimination round

Team standings

Sixth seed playoff

Bracket

Quarterfinals
Shell and San Miguel have a twice-to-beat advantage

(3) San Miguel vs. (6) Purefoods

(4) Shell vs. (5) Sunkist

Semifinals

(1) Alaska vs. (4) Shell

(2) Ginebra vs. (3) San Miguel

Third place playoff

Finals

References

External links
 PBA.ph

Governors' Cup
1996